County Route 15 (CR 15) is an unsigned county road in Nassau County, New York. It travels between Port Washington Boulevard (New York State Route 101, NY 101) in Port Washington at its north end and Old Northern Boulevard (CR D71) in the Village of Roslyn at its southern end. A small portion also passes through the Village of Flower Hill.

This route travels along Beacon Hill Road and Roslyn West Shore Road (also known as West Shore Road), and is maintained in its entirety by the Nassau County Department of Public Works.

Route description 

Starting from its northern end, County Route 15 starts at the intersection of Beacon Hill Road, Main Street, and Port Washington Boulevard (NY 101) in Port Washington. From there, it continues east-southeast through Port Washington, along Beacon Hill Road. It then makes a sharp turn to the south, and becomes West Shore Road. CR 15 then passes the North Hempstead Beach Park (also known as Bar Beach) and the Harbor Links Country Club. Continuing south, the road passes the Town of North Hempstead Solid Waste Center and the Harbor Park Industrial Park. It then enters the Village of Flower Hill and the village's Harbor Village housing development, along with the historic George Washington Denton House. It then passes underneath the William Cullen Bryant Viaduct (NY 25A) and enters Roslyn. Just south of the bridge, CR 15 passes Mott Avenue (CR D63), and then intersects with Old Northern Boulevard (CR D71), where it terminates.

Major intersections

See also 

 List of county routes in Nassau County, New York

References 

County routes in Nassau County, New York